Virus latency (or viral latency) is the ability of a pathogenic virus to lie dormant (latent) within a cell, denoted as the lysogenic part of the viral life cycle.  A latent viral infection is a type of persistent viral infection which is distinguished from a chronic viral infection. Latency is the phase in certain viruses' life cycles in which, after initial infection, proliferation of virus particles ceases. However, the viral genome is not eradicated.  The virus can reactivate and begin producing large amounts of viral progeny (the lytic part of the viral life cycle) without the host becoming reinfected by new outside virus, and stays within the host indefinitely.

Virus latency is not to be confused with clinical latency during the incubation period when a virus is not dormant.

Mechanisms

Episomal latency 
Episomal latency refers to the use of genetic episomes during latency.  In this latency type, viral genes are stabilized, floating in the cytoplasm or nucleus as distinct objects, either as linear or lariat structures.  Episomal latency is more vulnerable to ribozymes or host foreign gene degradation than proviral latency (see below).

Herpesviridae 
One example is the herpes virus family, Herpesviridae, all of which establish latent infection. Herpes virus include chicken-pox virus and herpes simplex viruses (HSV-1, HSV-2), all of which establish episomal latency in neurons and leave linear genetic material floating in the cytoplasm.

Eppstein-Barr virus 
The Gammaherpesvirinae subfamily is associated with episomal latency established in cells of the immune system, such as B-cells in the case of Epstein–Barr virus. Epstein–Barr virus lytic reactivation (which can be due to chemotherapy or radiation) can result in genome instability and cancer.

Herpes simplex virus 
In the case of herpes simplex (HSV), the virus has been shown to fuse with DNA in neurons, such as nerve ganglia or neurons, and HSV reactivates upon even minor chromatin loosening with stress, although the chromatin compacts (becomes latent) upon oxygen and nutrient deprivation.

Cytomegalovirus 
Cytomegalovirus (CMV) establishes latency in myeloid progenitor cells, and is reactivated by inflammation. Immunosuppression and critical illness (sepsis in particular) often results in CMV reactivation. CMV reactivation is commonly seen in patients with severe colitis.

Advantages and disavdantages 
Advantages of episomal latency include the fact that the virus may not need to enter the cell nucleus, and hence may avoid nuclear domain 10 (ND10) from activating interferon via that pathway.

Disadvantages include more exposure to cellular defenses, leading to possible degradation of viral gene via cellular enzymes.

Reactivation 
Reactivation may be due to stress, UV light, etc.

Proviral latency 

A provirus is a virus genome that is integrated into the DNA of a host cell.

Advantages and disadvantages 
Advantages include automatic host cell division results in replication of the virus's genes, and the fact that it is nearly impossible to remove an integrated provirus from an infected cell without killing the cell.

A disadvantage of this method is the need to enter the nucleus (and the need for packaging proteins that will allow for that). However, viruses that integrate into the host cell's genome can stay there as long as the cell lives.

HIV 
One of the best-studied viruses that does this is HIV. HIV uses reverse transcriptase to create a DNA copy of its RNA genome. HIV latency allows the virus to largely avoid the immune system. Like other viruses that go latent, it does not typically cause symptoms while latent.  Unfortunately, HIV in proviral latency is nearly impossible to target with antiretroviral drugs.  Several classes of latency reversing agents (LRAs) are under development for possible use in shock-and-kill strategies in which the latently infected cellular reservoirs would be reactivated (the shock) so that anti-viral treatment could take effect (the kill).

Maintaining latency 
Both proviral and episomal latency may require maintenance for continued infection and fidelity of viral genes.  Latency is generally maintained by viral genes expressed primarily during latency.  Expression of these latency-associated genes may function to keep the viral genome from being digested by cellular ribozymes or being found out by the immune system.  Certain viral gene products (RNA transcripts such as non-coding RNAs and proteins) may also inhibit apoptosis or induce cell growth and division to allow more copies of the infected cell to be produced.

An example of such a gene product is the latency associated transcripts (LAT) in herpes simplex virus, which interfere with apoptosis by downregulating a number of host factors, including major histocompatibility complex (MHC) and inhibiting the apoptotic pathway.

A certain type of latency could be ascribed to the endogenous retroviruses. These viruses have incorporated into the human genome in the distant past, and are now transmitted through reproduction.  Generally these types of viruses have become highly evolved, and have lost the expression of many gene products. Some of the proteins expressed by these viruses have co-evolved with host cells to play important roles in normal processes.

Ramifications 

While viral latency exhibits no active viral shedding nor causes any pathologies or symptoms, the virus is still able to reactivate via external activators (sunlight, stress, etc.) to cause an acute infection.  In the case of herpes simplex virus, which generally infects an individual for life, a serotype of the virus reactivates occasionally to cause cold sores.  Although the sores are quickly resolved by the immune system, they may be a minor annoyance from time to time.  In the case of varicella zoster virus, after an initial acute infection (chickenpox) the virus lies dormant until reactivated as herpes zoster.

More serious ramifications of a latent infection could be the possibility of transforming the cell, and forcing the cell into uncontrolled cell division.  This is a result of the random insertion of the viral genome into the host's own gene and expression of host cellular growth factors for the benefit of the virus. In a notable event, this actually happened during gene therapy through the use of retroviral vectors at the Necker Hospital in Paris, where twenty young boys received treatment for a genetic disorder, after which five developed leukemia-like syndromes.

Human papilloma virus 
This is also seen with infections of the human papilloma virus in which persistent infection may lead to cervical cancer as a result of cellular transformation.

HIV 
In the field of HIV research, proviral latency in specific long-lived cell types is the basis for the concept of one or more viral reservoirs, referring to locations (cell types or tissues) characterized by persistence of latent virus. Specifically, the presence of replication-competent HIV in resting CD4-positive T cells allows this virus to persist for years without evolving despite prolonged exposure to antiretroviral drugs. This latent reservoir of HIV may explain the inability of antiretroviral treatment to cure HIV infection.

See also

 Slow virus

References

Virology
Viral life cycle